HD 68988 b is a hot jupiter located approximately 192 light-years away in the constellation of Ursa Major, orbiting the star HD 68988 in a moderately eccentric orbit.

The planet HD 68988 b is called Albmi. The name was selected in the NameExoWorlds campaign by Norway, during the 100th anniversary of the IAU. Albmi means sky in the Northern Sami language.

See also
 HD 68988 c

References

External links
 
 

Hot Jupiters
Ursa Major (constellation)
Exoplanets discovered in 2001
Giant planets
Exoplanets detected by radial velocity
Exoplanets with proper names